Lusha Deh (also Romanized as Lūshā Deh; also known as Lūshādī) is a village in Tutaki Rural District, in the Central District of Siahkal County, Gilan Province, Iran. At the 2006 census, its population was 103, in 28 families.

References 

Populated places in Siahkal County